Ivana Fišer (born Fischer; June 13, 1905 – September 7, 1967) was known Croatian-Jewish conductor.

Background 
Fišer was born in Zagreb on June 13, 1905 to a Jewish family of well-known Croatian architect Ignjat Fischer and his wife Helena (née Egersrodfer). 

She attended elementary and music school in Zagreb. Fišer graduated from the Academy of Music, University of Zagreb under Fran Lhotka as the first female conductor in Croatia. Soon after she left for Salzburg where she was perfecting herself at the Mozarteum University of Salzburg. 

From 1931 to 1934, Fišer worked as violinist at the Croatian Music Institute orchestra. As a conductor, Fišer debuted in 1933 while directing the comic opera Bastien und Bastienne with Zagreb philharmonic orchestra. 

From 1939 to 1941, she led the Zagreb Red Cross orchestra. Until 1941, she also led the Osijek philharmonic orchestra. 

From 1947 to 1965, Fišer worked as a prompter at the Croatian National Theatre in Zagreb.

References

Bibliography

 
 
 

1905 births
1967 deaths
Musicians from Zagreb
Croatian Jews
Austro-Hungarian Jews
Croatian Austro-Hungarians
Croatian conductors (music)
Women conductors (music)
Academy of Music, University of Zagreb alumni
20th-century conductors (music)
20th-century women musicians